The Oriental skylark (Alauda gulgula), also known as the small skylark, is a species of skylark found in the southern, central and eastern Palearctic . Like other skylarks, it is found in open grassland where it feeds on seeds and insects.

Taxonomy and systematics
The Oriental skylark was described by the English soldier and naturalist James Franklin in 1831 and given the binomial name Alauda gulgula. The meaning of the specific epithet gulgula is uncertain but is perhaps a reference to the song as gula is Latin for "throat" or may be the color of the "gulgula" or a sweet which looks like doughnut made in many parts of Central India. 

Other alternate names for the Oriental skylark include eastern skylark, Indian skylark and lesser skylark.

Subspecies 
Thirteen subspecies are recognized: 
 Kashmir skylark (A. g. lhamarum) or Kashmir small skylark - Meinertzhagen, R & Meinertzhagen, A, 1926: Found in the Pamir Mountains and western Himalayas
 A. g. inopinata - Bianchi, 1905: Found on the Tibetan Plateau and north-western China
 A. g. vernayi - Mayr, 1941: Found in the eastern Himalayas and south-western China
 Western Oriental skylark (A. g. inconspicua) or Turkestan small skylark - Severtsov, 1873: Originally described as a separate species. Found from southern Kazakhstan to eastern Iran, Pakistan and north-western India
 A. g. gulgula - Franklin, 1831: Found from north-central India to Sri Lanka and east to northern Indochina
 A. g. dharmakumarsinhjii - Abdulali, 1976: Found in west-central India
 A. g. australis - Brooks, WE, 1873: Originally described as a separate species. Found in south-western India 
 A. g. weigoldi - Hartert, 1922: Found in central and eastern China
 A. g. coelivox - R. Swinhoe, 1859: Originally described as a separate species. Found in southern and south-eastern China, northern Vietnam
 A. g. sala - R. Swinhoe, 1870: Originally described as a separate species. Found on Hainan Island (off south-eastern China)
 A. g. herberti - Hartert, 1923: Found from central and eastern Thailand to southern Vietnam
 A. g. wattersi - R. Swinhoe, 1871: Originally described as a separate species. Found in Taiwan
 A. g. wolfei - Hachisuka, 1930: Found on Luzon (northern Philippines)

Description
They have streaked, yellow-brown upper plumage, with white outer tail feathers and a short crest. Both sexes are similar.

Behaviour and ecology
These skylarks frequently rocket up into the sky, fluttering and singing before descending down to earth. Male Oriental skylarks may also hover in the air and sing, in order to attract a mate.

References

External links 

 Haryana Online
 Birding in Taiwan

Oriental skylark
Birds of Central Asia
Birds of South Asia
Birds of Southeast Asia
Birds of China
Oriental skylark
Oriental skylark